The Brennabor Juwel 8   is an eight-cylinder automobile introduced the Brennabor company in 1930 to complement their then recently introduced Juwel 6 model.

The Juwel 8 was powered by a newly developed 8-cylinder side-valve engine of 3.4 litres, mounted ahead of the driver and delivering 60 hp at 3,200 rpm.  Power was delivered to the rear wheels through a single plate dry clutch and a three-speed gear box controlled using a centrally positioned floor-mounted gear stick.

The car sat on a U-profile pressed steel chassis with rigid axles and semi-elliptical leaf springing.   It was offered as a four-door four-seater sedan/saloon or a four-door “Pullman” sedan/saloon with six seats.  The mechanically linked foot brake operated directly on all four wheels, while the handbrake operated on the rear wheels.

The last Juwel 8 appears to have been produced in 1932, by when approximately 100 had been built.

Technical data

Sources 
•	Oswald, Werner: Deutsche Autos 1920–1945, Motorbuch Verlag Stuttgart, 10. Auflage (1996), 

Brennabor vehicles
Motorcycles introduced in the 1930s